Fraser Island is an uninhabited island in the Qikiqtaaluk Region of Nunavut, Canada. It is located at the mouth of Hudson Bay off Nottingham Island's northwestern tip. The closest community is the Inuit hamlet of Kinngait,  to the northeast on Baffin Island.

Geography
The island's habitat is characterized by tundra, inlets, coastal marine features, coastal cliffs, and rocky marine shores.

Fauna
Fraser Island is a Canadian Important Bird Area (#NU024), as well as a Key Migratory Bird Terrestrial Habitat site (NU Site 46). Notable bird species include common eider as well as colonies of water birds/seabirds.

History
In 1965, the island, previously unnamed by Europeans, was called Fraser Island in honour of Robert James Fraser (1887–1965), first hydrographer for the Dominion of Canada.

References 

Uninhabited islands of Qikiqtaaluk Region
Important Bird Areas of Qikiqtaaluk Region